The Catholic Church in Singapore has been extensively involved in the provision of education in Singapore. From the 19th century, the Catholic education system has grown to be the second biggest sector after government schools in Singapore, with more than 65 000 students. The Catholic Church has established kindergarten, primary, secondary and junior colleges educational institutions in Singapore.

History

 
Roman Catholicism in Singapore has its roots from the Portuguese established Diocese of Malacca soon after Affonso de Albuquerque's conquest of Malacca in 1511. It is believed that there had been Portuguese missionaries operating out of Malacca in Singapore during the Portuguese period, 1511–1641, prior to the British conquest. Within a time span of several years, notable Catholic churches, such as the Cathedral of the Good Shepherd, were built. Missionary schools, notably Saint Joseph's Institution, were established and attended by Roman Catholics and non-Catholics (many of whom became converts).

Saint John's Institution (now known as Saint Joseph's Institution), was founded in 1852 as an all-boys Catholic school and is the first missionary establishment of the La Salle Brothers in Asia. The endeavour was initiated by Rev Fr Jean-Marie Beurel MEP, who offered six Brothers from Europe to start the school using a former chapel as premises. The school was known as St John's, but on 19 March 1855 (Feast of Saint Joseph), the cornerstone of a new school building was laid. From that date, the school has been known as Saint Joseph's Institution. The new central classroom block was completed in 1865, though further expansion of the facilities continued well into the 20th Century. The school had 426 students in 1900. This grew to almost 1200 in 1914, and 1600 in 1922. With the student population expanding, a temporary branch school was opened, which eventually led to the building of a second school – Saint Patrick's School, Singapore – in 1933. During the Japanese Occupation, the school was renamed to Bras Basah Road Boys' School. The Brothers were soon asked to 'resign'. The school and hostel were run along military lines. However, 3 weeks after the Japanese surrender, the Brothers returned and St Joseph's was re-opened and normal lessons resumed.

Noting the absence of an all-rounded Catholic education for girls, three French and an Irish sister led by Mother St Mathilde Raclot established the Convent of the Holy Infant Jesus in 1854 at the corner of Bras Basah Road and Victoria Street (presently CHIJMES). Classes started at the school for fee paying students and orphans. The Convent of the Holy Infant Jesus was the second Catholic school and first all-girls Catholic school to be established in Singapore. Soon the number of pupils increased and the school became well-known. In 1894, there were 167 pupils. Ten years later, the enrolment had increased to 300. Secondary education began in 1905. Under Mother Hombeline, the expansion programme continued.

Under the Montfort Brothers of St. Gabriel, seven institutions serving the youth of Singapore were founded, St. Gabriel's Secondary School, St. Gabriel's Primary School, Montfort Secondary School, Monfort Junior School, Assumption English School, Assumption Pathway School, and Boys Town. Much of the progress of the seven institutions can be attributed to the late Bro. Emmanuel, born Pierre Gaudette, who was dedicated to developing the institutions to give a quality of education that is unparalleled.

In a span of less than 100 years, more than 57 educational institutes from kindergarten to junior colleges were established in Singapore by Catholic missionaries from the La Salle Brothers, Sisters of the Holy Infant Jesus, Marist Brothers, and the Canossians.

Administration and Funding
In Singapore, most Catholic schools are funded partially by the Ministry of Education, making them government aided. Teachers teaching in government aided Catholic schools in Singapore are trained and posted by the National Institute of Education and the Ministry of Education. Basic essentials such as tables, chairs, computers and whiteboard are provided by the Ministry of Education while the construction of the school building or building maintenance are paid for by the school through the Archdiocese of Singapore. Students enrolled in government aided Catholic schools are also subsidised by the government.  All Singaporean students enrolled in Catholic schools in Singapore are required to sing the national anthem and recite the pledge, similar to government schools. While Catholic schools must adhere to the broad requirements of Singapore's secular education system, they are free to provide a "Catholic" education ethos, which includes the Catholic social teachings.

Prestige
St Joseph's Institution, Catholic High School and CHIJ St Nicholas Girls' School are regarded as a few of the most prestigious schools in Singapore. These schools have produced top GCE "O" Level Students more than once. The cut off point for entrance to these schools are consistently high, catering to elite students.

Catholic High has produced 20 president's Scholars and numerous recipients of other scholarships. Many of its alumni are leaders in the public and private sectors. Catholic High is recognized as one of the top schools in Singapore, having been ranked in the Band 1 tables of the Ministry of Education school academic rankings. In 2008 it was awarded the School Distinction Award under the MOE Master Plan of Awards, which recognizes high-achieving schools with exemplary processes and practices.

St Joseph's Institution is also consistently ranked among the top secondary schools in Singapore. In September 2005, the school was one of the few in Singapore to be awarded the coveted School Distinction Award as part of the Ministry of Education's 2005 Masterplan Awards. It has been awarded the Best Practice Award for teaching and learning. SJI has received the Sustained Achievement Award for Sports and the Sustained Achievement Award for Uniformed Groups for the third and seventh consecutive year respectively. In 2008, the school was re-validated with the Singapore Quality Class Award, obtained, for the second time, the Best Practice Award (Teaching and Learning) and attained the Best Practice Award (Student All-Round Development) in the MOE External Validation exercise. The school received consecutive Sustained Achievement Awards in Academic Value-Added, Sports, Uniformed Groups and Fitness. In 2009, SJI was recognized by MOE with a pinnacle award - The School of Excellence Award. The School Excellence Award (SEA) recognises schools for their excellence in both education processes and outcomes. It is the highest and most prestigious award in the Masterplan of Awards framework in MOE, Singapore.

CHIJ St Nicholas' Girls' School is also considered one of the premier educational institutes in Singapore, ranking third in the list of top secondary girls' schools, and among the top 10 secondary schools in Singapore. SNGS has produced the top student for the GCE O' levels for 4 years in a row ( 2008, 2009, 2010, 2011).

Maris Stella High School is also doing well, being ranked in Band 3 in the 2011 school achievement tables based on the 2011 O level results, and is considered to be one of the top 20 secondary schools in Singapore.

Other Catholic schools of considerable prestige and quality, include St. Gabriel's Secondary School, St. Patrick's School, and Montfort Secondary School, where new, innovative methods of learning are being introduced. Despite such groundbreaking development, an all rounded Catholic education remains at the forefront.

Alumni

Since the establishment of Catholic schools in Singapore, many prominent public figures have attended Catholic schools in Singapore. These prominent figures include politicians, businessman, sportsman, entertainers, academics among other occupations. In recent years, alumni of Catholic schools include Prime Minister Lee Hsien Loong, Cabinet Minister Lim Swee Say, Supreme Court Judge, Chao Hick Tin and Actor Tay Ping Hui who graduated from Catholic High School. President Tony Tan, Deputy Prime Minister Teo Chee Hean, Former Cabinet Ministers, George Yeo and Mah Bow Tan and Entertainer Dick Lee who graduated from St Joseph's Institution. Alumnus from the Convent of the Holy Infant Jesus includes Actress Jacintha Abisheganaden and Ambassador Chan Heng Chee. Lee Yi Shyan, Minister of State for Manpower and National Development, graduated from Maris Stella High School. Several leaders of the Catholic Church in Singapore including Archbishop William Goh, are alumni of the seven institutions of the Montfort Brothers of St. Gabriel.

List of Schools

Kindergartens | Primary | Secondary | Junior College | International | Vocational / Specialised Institutes

Kindergartens

Kindergartens | Primary | Secondary | Junior College | International | Vocational / Specialised Institutes

Primary schools
<updated 20 July 2019>

Primary One Registration Ballot History

If distance is indicated, it means Singapore Citizens residing within the specific distance from the school have to ballot for the specific Phase. Unless "PR" or Permanent Residents are indicated all data refers to Singapore Citizens. For more information on primary one registration visit this official website.

Kindergartens | Primary | Secondary | Junior College | International | Vocational / Specialised Institutes

Secondary schools
<updated 20 July 2019>

Kindergartens | Primary | Secondary | Junior College | International | Vocational / Specialised Institutes

Junior colleges
Catholic Junior College

International schools
St Joseph's Institution International

Vocational / Specialised Institutes
Assumption Pathway School

See also 
 Archdiocese of Singapore
 List of Roman Catholic churches in Singapore
 Christianity in Singapore
 Ministry of Education, Singapore
 Jean-Marie Beurel
Montfort Brothers of St. Gabriel

References